Old Italic is a Unicode block containing a unified repertoire of several Old Italic scripts used in various parts of Italy starting about 700 BCE, including the Etruscan alphabet and others that were derived from it (or cognate with it).  All those languages went extinct by about the 1st century BCE; except Latin, which however evolved its own Latin alphabet that is covered by other Unicode blocks.

Unification
For each script, each code point denotes zero or more symbols that are believed to be equivalent in that script, even if they had very different shapes.  For example, in the Archaic Etruscan alphabet (used from the 7th to 5th century BCE) one letter, apparently derived from the Western Ancient Greek letter theta, could be written as a circle with an inscribed "X", or just as a circle. Those two symbols were mapped to the same code point U+10308, "OLD ITALIC LETTER THE" = "𐌈".  

Also, two symbols in different scripts were mapped to the same code point if they appeared to have a genetic or phonemic identity, even if their shapes and/or pronunciations were clearly distinct.  For example, the Etruscans used a symbol like "C", believed to have evolved from the Ancient Greek letter gamma, for the "k" sound of their language.  That symbol was assumed to be the origin of (or cognate with) a symbol of the Oscan alphabet that looked like "<" and had the sound of "g".  Those two symbols were therefore mapped to the same code point U+10302, "OLD ITALIC LETTER KE" = "𐌂".

Therefore, the appearance of those code points when displayed or printed—as in the table below—is likely to be incorrect, unless they are rendered with a font specifically designed for the particular language and letter style of the text.

Block

History
The following Unicode-related documents record the purpose and process of defining specific characters in the Old Italic block:

References 

Unicode blocks